Ole Hannibal Sommerfeldt Fegth (27 August 1879 – 15 September 1967) was a Norwegian rower who competed for Christiania Roklub. He competed in coxed eight and in coxed four, inriggers at the 1912 Summer Olympics in Stockholm.

References

External links
 
 

1879 births
1967 deaths
Rowers from Oslo
Norwegian male rowers
Rowers at the 1908 Summer Olympics
Rowers at the 1912 Summer Olympics
Olympic rowers of Norway